Peninnis Lighthouse is situated on Peninnis Head, St Mary's, Isles of Scilly.

History
The light was built to replace the lighthouse in the centre of the island of St Agnes and helps vessels to enter Hugh Town harbour, via St Mary's Sound.

Initially, the lamp used was an incandescent burner which was powered by oil gas; the fuel was kept on site in four pressurised tanks (with a total capacity of 700 cubic feet), which the local Trinity House vessel would keep replenished. It was classed as a 'semi-watched' light (i.e. it did not require the full-time attendance of a keeper).

In 1922 the lighthouse was converted to automatic acetylene operation. (Acetylene was used to drive the rotating optic as well as fuelling the lamp). It was converted to electricity in 1992. 

A single-tier LED lantern, mounted on the exterior rail of the structure, now provides the light; within the lantern the old revolving lens still remains in situ, but it is no longer in use.

See also

 List of lighthouses in England

References

External links

 Peninnis Lighthouse at Trinity House
 Worldwide Lighthouses

Lighthouses completed in 1911
Lighthouses in the Isles of Scilly
1911 establishments in England
Grade II listed lighthouses
Grade II listed buildings in Cornwall
St Mary's, Isles of Scilly